Mattia Gaspari (born 14 September 1993) is an Italian skeleton racer.

He won an historic medal for Italy, the first ever in the skeleton at the world championships, at the IBSF World Championships 2020.

Achievements

References

External links

1993 births
Living people
Italian male skeleton racers
Skeleton racers of Fiamme Azzurre
Skeleton racers at the 2022 Winter Olympics
Olympic skeleton racers of Italy